Ottawa West—Nepean is a provincial electoral district in eastern Ontario, Canada. It elects one member to the Legislative Assembly of Ontario.

The riding is represented in the Ontario legislature by the NDP's Chandra Pasma.

The riding has been fairly solidly Liberal.  In the 1999 provincial election, former Member of Provincial Parliament Alex Cullen lost the nomination to Rick Chiarelli following fierce party battles.  Cullen instead ran for the Ontario New Democratic Party (NDP). The seat was won by Tory Garry Guzzo.  In the 2003 provincial election, former Ottawa mayor Jim Watson ousted Guzzo.

Former Ottawa mayor Bob Chiarelli won the seat in a March 4, 2010, by-election, after Jim Watson left his seat to run in the 2010 Ottawa municipal election. Chiarelli lost his seat to PC Jeremy Roberts in 2018 which saw the former governing Liberals fall to third place in the legislature. In the 2022 provincial election the NDP's Chandra Pasma defeated Roberts, the only PC incumbent to lose his seat in the election. This marked the first time the NDP had ever won the seat, either provincially or federally.

History
The electoral district was created in 1999 from 77% of Ottawa West, 38% of Nepean and 21% of Ottawa—Rideau.

Members of Provincial Parliament

This riding has elected the following members of the Legislative Assembly of Ontario:

Election results

2007 electoral reform referendum

References

External links
Map of riding for 2018 election

Provincial electoral districts of Ottawa